Expatriate insurance policies are designed to cover financial and other losses incurred by expatriates while living and working in a country other than one's own.

Insurance should be arranged prior to relocating to a new country or destination. Policies will generally cover the duration of your stay and can be purchased on a 6-month to annual basis. It is important to purchase this insurance from a reputable company.

The most common insurance policies purchased by expatriates include health insurance, Personal property, Automobile insurance,short-term travel insurance and Life insurance. In some cases, specialty insurance can be purchased for high-risk areas of the world that provide coverage for war and terrorism, Kidnap and ransom and casualty insurance.

Expatriate personal property insurance

There are a number of ways to insure property while overseas.

Personal property insurance will provide coverage for all your valuable items. This type of cover is usually attached to a home insurance policy which will provide coverage for all "fixtures and fittings within the home" and "additional items of increased value". With a home insurance policy it is possible to include specific items on a "worldwide all risks" (WWAR) basis which will protect your valuables outside of your home. Insurers will typically require proof of value when insuring WWAR items and the addition of these items will increase the plans premium. In the USA this type of plan is commonly referred to as "renters insurance", although the scope of these policies overseas can have much wider implications.

Home insurance is different from fire insurance which protects the physical structure of the home and all rebuilding costs. Fire insurance policies are normally only obtained in the case that an individual actually owns the property and can be extended to cover "extra" or "allied perils". Extra perils can usually be added to a policy at the expense of an increased premium and can include typhoons/hurricanes/cyclones, flood damage, landslip and subsidence, and what in the USA is referred to as "an act of God". If you are expecting to be overseas for a short period of time it is highly unlikely that you will purchase a fire insurance policy unless otherwise stipulated in your tenancy agreement.

For individuals who are relocating overseas international transport insurance is usually a valuable plan. These plans are extremely broad in their scope and if the items insured are being shipped to their destination then the policy will usually be subject to marine insurance and maritime law. This includes all principals of average, salvage (different from the salvage found in property and auto insurance), and sue and tort. International transport insurance can be complicated as there are many different areas of consideration, typically an insurance company that deals with this area of insurance will have dedicated international transport specialists.

Property insurance claims can be complicated and are usually settled in the following ways:

Indemnity - The payment of monies to the insured to cover the loss. This is also known as a "Cash payment".
Repair - Payment to a repairer to fix the damaged item or property.
Replacement - With new items, property, or items that are likely to suffer very little depreciation, the insurer may choose to simply give the insured a new item that is the same as the one that was lost. This can be beneficial to the insurer, especially if they can obtain a discount from the supplier.
Restoration - Typically this means the restoration of the item or property to the condition that it was in immediately prior to the loss.
 New For Old - the substitution of a new item that acts the same way as the item that was lost or damaged.

It is important to check the policy schedule and understand in which way claims on a specific policy will be settled. Marine Insurance or marine-related insurance policies have long and complex claims procedures that are best left to experts.

Expatriate international auto insurance

Automobile primary liability (also known as third party liability) insurance is generally a required purchased in the country in which you are located. Local governments will require this in order to register your vehicle. Be aware that limits of coverage can be very low in some countries. If you are uncomfortable with the level of coverage available with third party coverage, you may wish to obtain comprehensive motor insurance. This type of plan can increase coverage to an appropriate level of protection.

Be aware when shopping for third party liability insurance that rates may vary drastically. Do not assume that the premium quote you receive is the standard within that country. Shopping for competitive rates is as essential abroad as it is in the United States or Europe.

It is very difficult to transfer auto insurance from country to country. No claims discount (NCD) or no claims bonus (NCB) may be transferred, however, and offer substantial discounts for expatriates worldwide.

The main types of auto (or motor) insurance available internationally are:

Third Party Coverage - This will provide coverage for an individuals liability at law to any third parties who have died or been injured, or any damaged to property resulting from an accident.
Third Party Fire and Theft Coverage - Comprising the scope of cover described above with the addition of property insurance on the vehicle but only in terms of a loss resulting from fire or theft.
Comprehensive Coverage - This is the insurance with the widest scope of cover. It includes both Third party, Fire, and Theft coverage with the addition of "all risks" insurance. Typically the premiums for Comprehensive Vehicle Cover are the highest on the market.

Different countries will have different requirements in regards to the minimum amount of coverage that an individual must have. These requirements are usually set forth by the country's Insurance Authority or Regulator. In nations that where previously British Colonies it is usually the case that every vehicle should be covered under a basic Third Party Liability Plan or ACT policy. ACT Insurance refers to the British Road Traffic Act of 1930, which laid out the basic requirements for motor insurance at that time. ACT insurance will only cover the insured for any death or injury resulting from an accident.

If you are unfamiliar with the laws regarding motor insurance in the country that you have relocated to you should talk to an insurance professional (either a real estate broker or agent) for more information.

Expatriate international health insurance

If you are not covered under a group medical insurance program, an individual international medical policy could be purchased. These policies include worldwide medical protection and also can include evacuation services. Many of these plans have direct-pay with hospitals & global networks worldwide as well as worldwide emergency assistance to help you find the best facilities to treat your conditions. Cost of expatriate insurance depends on a myriad of factors, including your age, medical history, country of coverage, national resources and In many cases, a country's level of industrialization. However, international healthcare and insurance may be less expensive than US domestic insurance and healthcare.

An International Health Insurance policy will typically calculate premiums based on a policyholder's age, current medical history, and area of coverage, rather than on their claims history. These plans usually offer one of two areas of coverage: Worldwide; or Worldwide excluding the USA (other countries may be excluded as well). The reason for this is that medical care in the USA is the most expensive in the world, but most international insurance companies will rank countries by medical costs and have premiums adjusted accordingly.

The majority of international health insurance plans for expatriates are, however, globally portable. This allows foreign nationals overseas to move fluidly form one country to the next without periods of no cover. This is a significant difference from local health insurance plans and makes these policies attractive to many individuals. For the most part, however, an international health insurance policy will not cover an individual when they have returned to their home nation ("home country coverage"), making the investment practical only if the policyholder is planning to be overseas for an extended period of time. Some policies also cover treatments in a person's home country often for a limited period of time.

Those traveling abroad for shorter periods of time might wish to purchase a travel medical policy which can provide assistance during emergency medical situations abroad. These policies are less expensive as they are time specific rather than annual policies, this allows the policyholder to specifically tailor the plan to the exact length of their trip. A majority of international travel insurance policies will also allow the policyholder to be evacuated to the nearest center of medical excellence in the event of a serious illness or injury; it is also possible to obtain repatriation coverage.

Policy-holders should understand how their medical policy will assist them if they need urgent medical care abroad, and specifically the assistance their policy will provide in locating medical facilities.

Policies are underwritten in one of two ways: moratorium; and full medical underwriting.  With moratorium underwriting, applicants are not required to disclose any medical declarations, and so some pre-existing conditions may be covered; although, there are restrictions to the coverage of pre-existing conditions. New or unexpected conditions occurring after the start date are covered according to policy conditions. Full medical underwriting requires the collection of a full medical history, and usually excludes coverage of pre-existing conditions.

Common international insurance exclusions
International insurance plans and policies, regardless of their type of cover, will always include exclusions for specific "Fundamental Risks" (risks of which there is no chance of recovery).

Fundamental Risks include:

Acts of War
Hostilities, Military Actions, Terrorist Acts, and Other Civil Commotions, whether war has been declared or not
Nuclear Explosions and resulting nuclear fallout
Contractual Liability - Liability of the insured which he has assumed under an agreement which normally would not have arisen

Many policies will have their own specific exclusions. These can be extremely broad or narrow depending on the type of policy or the company that has issued the insurance. It is common to find exclusions listed on a policy that have been worded "Directly Or Indirectly as a result". This means that even if the loss has occurred as an indirect case of an excluded item, the loss will not be covered in any way. It is for this reason that the insurance idea of proximate cause becomes so important. Underwriters will include exclusions to limit their risk to a specific type of loss.

A plans exclusions will always be specified in the policy schedule or attached exclusionary rider. Typically you will have to agree to the exclusion in the policy before it goes into effect.

References

Types of insurance